Michele Knotz is an American voice actress who works for New York City-based studios, including TAJ Productions, Headline Sound, and Central Park Media.

Career
Born in New Jersey, Knotz attended Marywood University in Scranton, Pennsylvania.

In 2003, she won the Anime Idol voice acting contest held at the now-defunct Big Apple Anime Fest convention in New York City. She debuted in the role of Hajime Yagi in The World of Narue. Since 2006, she has been the voices of Misty, May, Nurse Joy and Team Rocket's Jessie in Pokémon.

Filmography

Anime

Films

Video games

References

External links 

Living people
Marywood University alumni
American voice actresses
Place of birth missing (living people)
Year of birth missing (living people)
American video game actresses
21st-century American actresses
DeSales University alumni
Actresses from New York City
Twitch (service) streamers